Klöpferbach  is a river of Baden-Württemberg, Germany. It passes through Aspach and flows into the Murr near Backnang.

See also
List of rivers of Baden-Württemberg

References

Rivers of Baden-Württemberg
Rivers of Germany